KATZ (1600 kHz, "Hallelujah 1600") is an urban gospel AM radio station serving the area of St. Louis, Missouri, United States. The iHeartMedia, Inc. (previously Clear Channel Communications) outlet broadcasts with power level of 6 kW day/3.5 kW night.  Its transmitter is located in East St. Louis, Illinois, and operates from studios in St. Louis south of Forest Park.

KATZ is licensed by the FCC to broadcast a HD digital (hybrid) signal.

History
KATZ began broadcasting in 1955 as a Rhythm and blues/Soul music station. Broadcasters who worked at KATZ in the 1950s and 1960s include Gloria Pritchard, Dave Dixon, Jesse "Spider" Burks, Bernard Hayes, and Willie Mae Gracy.

In 1957 KATZ's ownership was transferred from the original owner, Bernice Schwartz, to Rollins Broadcasting, and in 1960 Laclede Radio Inc. purchased the station. Laclede maintained control of the station until 1986. Inter Urban Broadcasting, a minority-owned and local company, purchased KATZ AM and its sister station KATZ FM.

References

External links
KATZ official website

FCC History Cards for KATZ

ATZ
Gospel radio stations in the United States
Radio stations established in 1955
1955 establishments in Missouri
IHeartMedia radio stations
ATZ